Bye Bye Love may refer to:

 Bye Bye Love (film), a 1995 American comedy-drama
 "Bye Bye Love" (The Everly Brothers song), 1957
 "Bye Bye Love" (Cars song), 1978
 "Bye Bye Love", a song by the Backstreet Boys on their album This Is Us, 2009